Kyra Condie (born June 5, 1996) is an American rock climber. As of April 2019, she was ranked 13 in boulder category. In December 2019, she qualified for the 2020 Summer Olympics following her finish at the IFSC Combined Qualifier Toulouse 2019, becoming the second female American climber to do so.

Condie has attributed her climbing style that relies more on muscles than technique to training mostly at a small Minneapolis gym with only a 45-degree spray wall and the difficulty she has twisting her body because of her fused spine.

Competition highlights 
 2019 U.S. Climbing Combined Invitational - Gold Medal
 IFSC PanAmerican Championship (L, S, B, C) - Guayaquil (ECU) 2018 - Women's Combined - Gold Medal

Personal life and education 

Condie underwent vertebrate surgery at age 13 to correct spinal deformation. In 2018, she moved to train in Salt Lake City after graduating from the University of Minnesota. During the 2016 IFSC Climbing World Cup, Condie befriended Canadian climber and fellow Minnesota native Allison Vest. In spring 2020, with climbing competitions cancelled due to the COVID-19 pandemic, Vest moved in with Condie so they could train together at the USA Climbing Training Center in Salt Lake City, and the pair began documenting their training on their shared TikTok account.

References

External links 

Living people
1996 births
People from Shoreview, Minnesota
American rock climbers
Female climbers
University of Minnesota alumni
Sportspeople from Minnesota
Sportspeople from Salt Lake City
Sport climbers at the 2020 Summer Olympics
Olympic sport climbers of the United States